Alwyn Simpson (born 12 May 1984) is former professional rugby league player who played for the Brisbane Broncos. His only first-grade appearance came in Brisbane's qualifying final loss to the Melbourne Storm at Olympic Park in 2007. He played on a wing, playing one week after playing for Redcliffe in the Queensland Cup grand final. This appearance occurred a year after sustaining a serious leg injury after being hit by a car.

References

Brisbane Broncos players
1984 births
Living people
Rugby league wingers